Les Kosem, also known by the nom de guerre "Po Nagar", was a Cham military officer and a prominent figure in the Second Indochina War and the Cambodian Civil War. 

Kosem, a paratroop colonel, was the most senior Cham officer in the Royal Cambodian Army. During the later 1950s he had been responsible for setting up the FLC (Front de Libération du Champa), an organisation seeking greater autonomy for the Cham people. In 1964, acting on the advice of a French 'handler', Kosem made overtures to the leadership of BAJARAKA, a group seeking independence for the Degar people of the Vietnamese Central Highlands. Kosem was thought to have been acting as a double agent, working for both the Cambodian secret service and the French SDECE. The link between the FLC, BAJARAKA, and the Khmer Krom "White Scarves" separatist movement was to result in the creation of the guerrilla movement FULRO.

In 1968, after internal disagreements within FULRO, Kosem was to surround the movement's headquarters with several battalions of the Royal Cambodian Army, and arrest its president Y Bham Enuol.

Kosem was also heavily involved in directing clandestine shipments of weapons from the port of Sihanoukville in Cambodia to the Viet Cong, in accordance with a secret arrangement between the Cambodian Head of State, Norodom Sihanouk, and the North Vietnamese.

Following the Cambodian coup of 1970, Kosem became a prominent supporter of the Khmer Republic regime of Lon Nol, and rose to the rank of general within the Khmer National Armed Forces (FANK); he was part of the influential circle of officers around Nol's brother, Lon Non. In the first years of the civil war fought by Lon Nol's forces against the Khmer Rouge communists, Kosem's troops of the 5th Special Brigade were repeatedly engaged in the most active areas of insurgency, and gained a reputation for allegedly systematically slaughtering the inhabitants of pro-Khmer Rouge villages; the counterproductive results of this reputation led to the unit eventually being disbanded, according to some sources. Kosem became well known for his ferocity and for corruption, although was also known for his generosity. After 1974 he was appointed as a roving ambassador for the Khmer Republic.

After the Khmer Rouge victory of April 1975, Kosem escaped to Malaysia. He died of natural causes several years later.

References

Cambodian anti-communists
Cambodian Cham people
Cambodian military personnel
People of the Vietnam War
Year of death missing
Year of birth missing
Cambodian Muslims